Ormiston is a village in East Lothian, Scotland.

Ormiston may also refer to:

Places
 Ormiston, New Zealand,  is a suburb of Auckland also known as Flat Bush
 Ormiston, Queensland, Australia
 Ormiston, Saskatchewan, Canada
 Ormiston, Scottish Borders, a location
 Ormiston (District Electoral Area), Belfast, Northern Ireland

 Ormiston Creek flows into the Finke River in the Northern Territory, Australia

Other uses
 Ormiston (surname)
 Ormiston F.C., a football (soccer) club in Ormiston, East Lothian, Scotland
 Ormiston Trust, a charitable trust based in London, England

Schools
 Ormiston Bolingbroke Academy,  a secondary school in Runcorn, England
 Ormiston Denes Academy, a secondary school in Suffolk, England
 Ormiston Forge Academy, a secondary school in West Midlands, England
 Ormiston Horizon Academy, a secondary school in Stoke-on-Trent, England
 Ormiston Ilkeston Enterprise Academy, a secondary school in Derbyshire, England